James Sarsfield "Jim" Mitchel (born Mitchell; January 30, 1864 – July 3, 1921) was an Irish-born American field athlete who competed in the 1904 Olympics. He was one a group of Irish-American athletes known as the "Irish Whales."

Biography
Mitchell was born in Emly, County Tipperary, Ireland, He competed in events organized by the Gaelic Athletic Association (GAA) and was in the GAA's 1888 American Invasion Tour, where he won a gold and two silver medals at the national championships of the National Association of Amateur Athletes of America.  Like many of the GAA team, Mitchell remained in New York City rather than returning to Ireland at the end of the tour.  

Mitchel represented New York Athletic Club at the 1904 Olympics in St Louis, Missouri.  In the 56 lb weight throw he won the bronze medal. In the hammer throw competition he finished fifth and in the discus throw event he finished sixth.

Spalding Athletic Library issued several "how to" books, one being "How to become a weight thrower" by Olympian James Mitchel.

References

External links
 
 

1864 births
1921 deaths
American male hammer throwers
Athletes (track and field) at the 1904 Summer Olympics
Olympic bronze medalists for the United States in track and field
American people of Irish descent
Irish male hammer throwers
Male weight throwers
Medalists at the 1904 Summer Olympics
Olympic weight throwers
Olympic tug of war competitors of the United States
Tug of war competitors at the 1904 Summer Olympics